InterContinental Hotels Group (IHG), marketed as IHG Hotels & Resorts, is a British multinational hospitality company headquartered in Windsor, England. It is listed on the London Stock Exchange and the New York Stock Exchange. It is also a constituent of the FTSE 100 Index.

History

Bass Hotels
The origins of the business may be traced to 1777 when William Bass established the Bass Brewery in Burton-upon-Trent.

The company later changed its name to Bass Charrington. Its first entry into the lodging sector came with acquisition of tied public houses. In 1969, it launched the Crest Hotels chain.

In 1988, after the British government limited the number of pubs that brewers could directly own, Bass further invested in the expansion of its hotel business with the purchase of Holiday Inn International from shareholders. Bass sold off the bulk of Crest Hotels in 1990, and the few remaining properties were absorbed into the Holiday Inn chain. Bass expanded its hotel business again in 1998, acquiring the luxury Inter-Continental hotel chain from the Saison Group. The hotel division was then renamed from Holiday Hospitality to Bass Hotels & Resorts, to reflect its expansion beyond the Holiday Inn brand.

Bass changed its name to Six Continents in 2001, after having sold its brewing assets and the Bass name, and Bass Hotels & Resorts became Six Continents Hotels.

InterContinental Hotels Group
Six Continents announced in October 2002 that it would split itself in two, with one company holding its pubs and restaurants, and the other holding its hotel and soft drink businesses. The split was completed on 15 April 2003, establishing InterContinental Hotels Group as an independent company, alongside the pub company, Mitchells & Butlers. IHG's hotel portfolio at the time comprised 3,325 properties, primarily under the Holiday Inn, Crowne Plaza, and InterContinental brands. Of those, 190 were owned or leased by the company, with the remainder under management or franchise agreements.

After the separation from Six Continents, IHG began an asset disposal program, selling off hotels to move towards an "asset-light" model focused on franchising and management. From 2003 to 2015, the company sold around 200 hotels for a total of almost $8 billion, leaving only 7 owned or leased properties in the portfolio.

In 2004, IHG acquired the Candlewood Suites brand, a midscale extended stay hotel brand with 108 franchised properties in the United States, for $15 million.

IHG divested its soft drink holdings in 2005, selling its 48 percent stake in Britvic for £371 million through an initial public offering.

In 2015, IHG acquired Kimpton Hotels, a boutique hotel brand with 62 managed properties, for $430 million.

In February 2021, IHG announced an annual loss of $153 million caused by restrictions related to the COVID-19 pandemic. However, the company expected that the Holiday Inn Express brand would help in the recovery process.

Operations

The company's worldwide headquarters and European offices are located in Denham, Buckinghamshire, England. IHG maintains regional offices in Atlanta, Singapore and Shanghai.

In 2012, IHG claimed more than 5,400 hotels, with 4,433 operated under franchise agreements, 907 managed by the company but separately owned and eight directly owned. As of 31 March 2019, IHG has 842,759 guest rooms and 5,656 hotels across nearly 100 countries.

Brands
IHG has 18 brands marketed under five segments:

Criticism

International boycott 
The InterContinental Hotels Group became the target of an international boycott campaign in May 2013 over their plan to operate an InterContinental-brand luxury hotel in Lhasa, Tibet. According to campaigners from the Free Tibet campaign, the hotel was a "PR coup for the Chinese government."

Price fixing 
In July 2012, the Office of Fair Trading alleged that IHG had broken competition law by preventing online travel agents from discounting the price of room-only hotel accommodations. In February 2014, IHG agreed to end the practice of price fixing.

Data breach 
In February 2017, IHG admitted to a data breach. The company asserted that the compromise was minor, having impacted 12 properties. However, in April 2017, it raised the number to 1,200 hotels. The attackers had installed malware designed to access payment-card data that could be used to clone cards and make fraudulent payments.

In September 2022, IHG admitted another data breach which had significantly disrupted the booking applications. IHG confirmed they were working on getting the systems back up and running and further details would follow. BBC later reported that the culprits were a Vietnamese couple that were unable to execute a ransomware attack and so deleted internal data for fun.

VAT rules 
In May 2012, the UK Advertising Standards Authority (ASA) warned IHG that it must include VAT in its advertised prices. In August 2012, a report by Which? magazine showed that IHG was continuing to violate VAT rules.

Living wage 
In November 2017, London mayor Sadiq Khan accused IHG of failing to fulfill a commitment to pay a living wage.

Food poisoning
In July 2016 Intercontinental Adelaide was responsible for giving at least 70 diners salmonella food poisoning. Twenty-one of these people had to be treated at hospital.

Hygiene standards
In September 2017, a consumer-rights group accused Intercontinental Beijing Sanlitun of substandard hygiene conditions. During an undercover operation, the group had marked bed linen and toilets with an invisible stamp, and upon returning the next day, the marks remained.

Loyalty scheme
In April 2015, IHG changed the terms and conditions of its Priority Club. Until then, points were awarded for life and members had been informed that their points would never expire. Following the change, points will now expire if no earning or redemption activity occurs within 12 consecutive months. Many members did not receive any communication about the change before their points expired.

References

External links

 

 
Companies listed on the London Stock Exchange
Hotel and leisure companies of the United Kingdom
Hospitality companies
Drink companies of the United Kingdom
Companies based in Buckinghamshire
Hospitality companies established in 2003
Multinational companies headquartered in England
Denham, Buckinghamshire